Anatoma lamellata is a species of minute sea snail, a marine gastropod mollusk or micromollusk in the family Anatomidae.

Description
The globose-conoidal shell grows to a height of 3.5 mm. The conical spire has 3½ whorls that are a little convex. They are cancellated with
radiating, subdistant lamellae, and show elevated transverse lines in the interstices. The lamellae are flexuous on the base. The aperture is subcircular. The inner lip is dilated, angular and broadly reflexed in the middle. It partly covers the umbilicus.

Distribution
This marine species occurs off Japan.

References

 Geiger D.L. (2012) Monograph of the little slit shells. Volume 1. Introduction, Scissurellidae. pp. 1-728. Volume 2. Anatomidae, Larocheidae, Depressizonidae, Sutilizonidae, Temnocinclidae. pp. 729–1291. Santa Barbara Museum of Natural History Monographs Number 7.

External links
 To Encyclopedia of Life
 To World Register of Marine Species

Anatomidae
Gastropods described in 1862